Sermik is a village in Skardu District in the Gilgit-Baltistan region of northeastern Pakistan.
it is approx 45 Km away from Skardu.The people of sermik is very kind and Generous ,furthermore sermik is at a great location,it is located approximately in central of District Kharmang, District Ghangche and District Skardu.
The people of sermik posses innate intelligence.They have their great history & Cultural heritage. Unequivocally it's among the most beautiful place in Gilgit Baltistan.ie Gorgeous mountains, Captivating culture, largest Artificial forest, The mighty indus river passes from here , Likewise there is also a big stream. Most people grow potato & sells them and earns thousands of rupees from it.Potatoes are perennial plants planted in the spring and harvested in the fall. Similarly people of the Land Looks busy in agricultural works & agrarian.

Geography
It lies to the southwest of Keris, to the north of Mehdiabad. The road following the Indus to the southeast of Sermik leads to near Hunderman on the Indian border.

There is a branch of the F.G. Boys High School in Sermik. Al-Mashriq Public School was established in 1996 by NGO EASTS (Educational & Social Team Services).

There are rock paintings at Chaghe Bress above Sermik Dam and Hydro Power Station in the vicinity.

References

Populated places in Skardu District